Sarafu-Credit (sarafu is the Kiswahili word for 'currency') is a community currency system operated in Kenya.  It is used by five different communities, all located in informal settlements or slum areas, including small businesses and schools.

The community currency system takes the form of paper notes, circulating alongside the national currency, the Kenyan shilling. It aims at fostering local trade by mobilizing under-used resources, and at satisfying basic needs (such as accessing food and paying school fees) by allowing users to trade even when the national currency is scarce.

The adoption of the community currency has generated an average 22% increase in participating businesses' incomes. In using communities, up to 10% of local food purchases are being done using the community currency. Field studies have also shown that Sarafu-Credit usage is positively correlated to increasing levels of trust among community members.

Such monetary innovation is designed to go beyond official development assistance, by considering the nature of money or credit and alternatives way it can be created.

The Sarafu-Credit system has been developed and is implemented by a Kenyan-based non-profit foundation called Grassroots Economics.

History 

The first complementary currency introduced in Kenya was the Eco-Pesa, founded by Will Ruddick. The complementary currency in Kongowea, Mombasa County, was in circulation between August 2009 and November 2010, as part of a donor-funded environmental project. Instead of directly spending the donor funds, the complementary currency allowed to realize the projects' objectives as well as boosting the local economy. Beside the collection of 20 tonnes of waste and the creation of three youth-led community tree nurseries, the use of Eco-Pesa resulted in a 22% average increase in participating businesses' incomes.

After the success of the project, it was followed by Bangla-Pesa in 2013. Will Ruddick, Caroline Dama and four other program members were falsely accused of undermining the Kenyan schilling and all charges were dropped after investigations and a petition was signed by 200 Academics at the Hague to support the program.

Local groups 

In 2017, six communities are currently using Sarafu-Credit in Kenya totaling over 1200 users. The system is the same in all of them, though each community uses its own version of Sarafu-Credit, giving it a unique name depending on the local toponyms, and managing it independently.

In South-Africa, two community currencies have taken inspiration from the Sarafu-Credit model and were consulted by Grassroots Economics Foundation: the K'Mali and the Berg-Rand.

Sarafu (Currency) Model 

The model consists of 3 implementation stages with steps outlined below.

Asset Development Phase

Community Currency

Local Asset Ownership and Regional Markets

References 

Local currencies
Economy of Kenya
Currency